Larnaca Synagogue, also known as "Cyprus Central Synagogue" is one of 5 synagogues in Cyprus. Located in Larnaca, it was inaugurated on 12 September 2005.

Overview
The synagogue is affiliated with the Orthodox denomination, but welcomes Jews from other denominations and visitors of all backgrounds. Until its opening, Cyprus was the only EU nation without a synagogue. Chief Rabbi of Israel Yona Metzger told a crowd at the inauguration ceremony, "This is a historic event for Cyprus. We are very happy Cyprus is open to all religions." Cypriot Education Minister Pefkios Georgiades said, "Cyprus is a state where all religions are tolerated and we welcome the Jewish synagogue." The ceremony included the inauguration of a Torah scroll and the laying of the cornerstone for a mikveh. There is also a Jewish cemetery.

See also
History of the Jews in Cyprus

References

External links
Jewish Cyprus
Rabbinate Cyprus

2005 establishments in Cyprus
Larnaca
Synagogues in Cyprus
Jewish Cypriot history
Orthodox Judaism in the Middle East